Presidential transition may refer to:
 Argentina presidential transition
 Philippines presidential transition
 Presidential transition of Benigno Aquino III
 Presidential transition of Rodrigo Duterte
 Spanish presidential transition
 United States presidential transition
 Presidential transition of Joe Biden
 Presidential transition of Donald Trump
 Presidential transition of Barack Obama
 Planned presidential transition of Mitt Romney